Radioiodinated serum albumin, abbreviated RISA, is a marker used in identifying blood plasma via the dilution method in renal physiology.

References

Further reading
 
 
 

Renal physiology
Iodine